Metalworks Institute is a post-secondary institution based in Mississauga, Ontario, Canada and Fredericton, New Brunswick, Canada. Metalworks Institute offers certificates, diplomas, and advanced diplomas, on-campus and online, educating students for direct entry into careers in the entertainment industry or for articulation into undergraduate degrees. The institute was founded by Gil Moore (Inductee of the Mississauga Music Walk of Fame) of the Canadian rock band Triumph (inductees into the Canadian Music Hall of Fame), and is the educational extension of Metalworks Studios, Canada's largest music recording studio, and Metalworks Production Group.  Metalworks Institute delivers programs in four core streams: Live Music, Recorded Music, Entertainment Business and Music Performance, at the flagship Mississauga campus and at the Fredericton campus.

Metalworks Institute received the inaugural Canadian Music & Broadcast Industry award for Music School of the Year in 2016  and again in 2019.

History and accreditation
Metalworks Institute Mississauga was founded in 2005 and is registered as a Private Career College under the Private Career Colleges Act, 2005. Metalworks Institute Fredericton was founded in 2020 and is a Private Occupational Training Organization registered under the Private Occupational Training Act, 1996. Metalworks Institute offers diploma and advanced diploma programs, on-campus and online, as well as individual certificate courses. Metalworks Institute faculty are music industry professionals with extensive entertainment industry experience and accolades. The Institute includes over 80 full-time staff members and has an enrollment of more than 250 students.

On November 20, 2013, the Metalworks Group was the recipient of the SME Excellence Award at the Ontario Business Achievement Awards (OBAA), presented by the Ontario Chamber of Commerce. In 2016, Metalworks Institute received the inaugural Canadian Music & Broadcast Industry award for Music School of the Year. They then received the Canadian Music & Broadcast Industry award for Music School of the Year a second time in 2019  In 2019, Metalworks Institute received the inaugural Paul Kitchin Award for Community Involvement from Career Colleges Ontario for their sponsorship of the Sound Engineering Program at Interprovincial Music Camp (IMC).

Academic programs
Metalworks Institute delivers programs on-campus and online in four core streams:

Live Music
 Live Event & Concert Production Diploma 
 Live Sound Diploma 
 Stage Lighting & Video Diploma

Music Business
 Music Business Diploma

Music Performance
 Music Performance Advanced Diploma

Recorded Music
 Audio Production & Engineering Diploma 
 Electronic Music Production Diploma 
 Music Mixing & Mastering (Post Graduate) Diploma 
 Recording Engineering Diploma

Interdisciplinary Programs
 Music Performance & Technology Advanced Diploma 
 Professional Sound (Audio Specialist) Diploma 
 Professional Sound & Business (Studio Production Major) Advanced Diploma 
 Professional Sound & Business (Recording Engineering Major) Advanced Diploma 
 Professional Sound & Business (Live Production Major) Advanced Diploma

Part-time certificate courses
Metalworks Institute is officially certified as an Avid Certified Learning Partner and offers certified training in Pro Tools  for both music and post-production as well as for live Venue (sound system). They also offer certificate courses in Apple's Logic Pro, Steinberg Cubase, Ableton Live  and Reason as well as official certification courses in Waves Audio.

Flagship Campus and Educational Facilities

Metalworks Institute's flagship campus is located in Mississauga, Ontario, adjacent to Metalworks Studios and Metalworks Production Group. There are regularly scheduled campus tours which are open to the public. Prospective students and parents are able to meet the school faculty and find information related to the programs, courses, and student resources offered at Metalworks Institute.

Educational Amenities
Metalworks Institute's studios were designed by acoustician Terry Medwedyk. The equipment used by the institute to educate its students is the same as that used by the professional clients who make use of Metalworks Studios. The studios are equipped with SSL and ICON consoles, Pro Tools HD systems and a wide variety of industry standard microphones, plug-ins and vintage outboard equipment. The Institute's partnership with Metalworks Production Group also gives the show production students access to the equipment used to produce a large variety of live events such as concerts, theatrical productions, large and small scale business conferences trade shows and conventions.  The institute has four professional recording studios dedicated to student use.

Notable alumni
 Nav, rapper
 Noel Cadastre, Award-winning mixer, music producer, audio engineer (OVO Sound)
 Riley Bell, Recording Engineer of the Year at the Juno Awards of 2018 
 Tim Oxford, musician in The Arkells
 WondaGurl, record producer

References

External links
Metalworks Institute
Metalworks Studios
Metalworks Production Group

Private colleges in Ontario
Performing arts education in Canada
Music schools in Canada
Vocational education in Canada
Colleges in Ontario
2005 establishments in Ontario